Srednja Vas v Bohinju is a village in the Municipality of Bohinj in the Upper Carniola region of Slovenia. It includes the hamlets of Kranjska Vas, Rudno Polje, V Renčah, Žale, Podojnica, Peca, Tržič, and Ptonec.

Geography
The territory of Srednja Vas v Bohinju extends northward from the village core in the south, along either side of the valley of Ribnica Creek to the western edge of the Pokljuka Plateau, with the Zajamniki, Praprotnica, and Uskovnica mountain pastures and the mountains above the Ore Valley, including Mount Viševnik.

Church

The parish church in the village is dedicated to Saint Martin. It is a Baroque church built over medieval foundations. The church has a fresco behind the main altar painted by Franc Jelovšek in 1755 and two additional exterior frescoes by Jelovšek. Other frescoes and paintings in the church were created by Matija Koželj (1842–1917) and Matevž Langus (1792–1855).

References

External links

Srednja Vas v Bohinju at Geopedia

Populated places in the Municipality of Bohinj